"Don't Wanna Cry" is a song by Japanese singer and record producer Namie Amuro released on the Avex Trax label, as her third single for her debut solo album Sweet 19 Blues (1996), It is her second consecutive million-selling single as well as her second consecutive number-one single. In December, the single took home the "Grand Prix Award" from the 38th Annual Japan Record Awards (analogous to Record of the Year from the Grammy Awards). 19 years old at the time, she is the youngest artist to have been awarded the grand prize.

Commercial tie-in 
"Don't Wanna Cry" was used in Daido Mistio commercials as its image song.

Accolades 
 Grand Prix Award (38th Annual Japan Record Awards)
 Best 5 Single Award (11th Japan Gold Disc Awards)

Track listing 
 "Don't Wanna Cry (Radio Edit)" (Tetsuya Komuro, Takahiro Maeda) – 4:40
 "Present" (Takahiro Maeda) – 4:39
 "Don't Wanna Cry (Original Karaoke)" (Tetsuya Komuro) – 4:37
 "Present (Original Karaoke)" (Takahiro Maeda) – 4:38

Personnel 
 Namie Amuro – vocals, background vocals

Production 
 Producer – Tetsuya Komuro
 Arranger – Tetsuya Komuro, Cozy Kubo
 Mixing – Chris Lord-Alge

Charts 
Oricon sales chart (Japan)

Oricon sales chart (Japan)

TV performances 
 December 31, 1996 – 38th Japan Record Awards
 December 31, 1996 &–; Kōhaku Uta Gassen
 June 5, 2006 – SMAPXSMAP

References 
  "Singing sensation plans Hawaii concert"

External links 
 Songwriter, Takahiro Maeda's thoughts on "Don't wanna cry"
 Songwriter, Takahiro Maeda's thoughts on "present"

1996 singles
1996 songs
Namie Amuro songs
Oricon Weekly number-one singles
Songs written by Tetsuya Komuro
Avex Trax singles